Tiggywinkles is a British animal welfare charity and wildlife hospital, also known as St Tiggywinkles and The Wildlife Hospital Trust. Tiggywinkles, which specialises in the rescue and treatment of wild animals, was founded in 1983 as the Wildlife Hospital Trust by Les Stocker as the United Kingdom's first wildlife hospital. The name derives from the hedgehog character in Beatrix Potter's story The Tale of Mrs. Tiggy-Winkle.

It is based at Haddenham, Buckinghamshire, where it operates an animal hospital and visitor centre, and teaches wild animal practice to veterinary surgeons and veterinary nurses.

History 
The animal welfare hospital takes its name from the character in the children's story The Tale of Mrs. Tiggy-Winkle, by English writer and illustrator Beatrix Potter.

In 1978, Les and Sue Stocker and their son Colin started caring for injured wild animals. In the following years, their activities began to attract attention and led to increasing numbers of animals being brought into their home. The Stockers formally registered The Wildlife Hospital Trust as a charity in 1983.

Les Stocker was the recipient of a Rolex Award for Enterprise in 1990 for his work at the hospital. In 1991, he was made a Member of the Order of the British Empire for services to wildlife. Les Stocker died on 16 July 2016, after a short illness, aged 73.

In 2018–9, Tiggywinkles had an annual expenditure of £1,618,673.

Cultural impact 

Les Stocker wrote a popular account of his work at the hospital, Something in a Cardboard Box: Tales from a Wildlife Hospital (1989) and a number of books based on the work of the hospital, including a veterinary manual, Practical Wildlife Care (2000).

Beginning in July 2008, Tiggywinkles was the setting for Wild Animal ER, a 20-part, half-hour documentary TV series presented by Kate Gerbeau, and shown on Channel Five in the UK.

It was also featured in the first episode of Come Outside called "Hedgehogs".

See also 

 Royal Society for the Prevention of Cruelty to Animals
 Wildlife rehabilitation

References

External links 

 
 
 Profile of Les Stocker
 A hospital for nonhumans

1983 establishments in the United Kingdom
Animal charities based in the United Kingdom
Animal welfare organisations based in the United Kingdom
Charities based in Buckinghamshire
Organizations established in 1983
Veterinary hospitals
Wildlife rehabilitation and conservation centers
Veterinary medicine in the United Kingdom